Edmund Jolliffe is a British composer of contemporary classical, choral and commercial music. He has written extensively for television and has also written much music for the concert hall. His music is published by Oxford University Press, Stainer and Bell and Banks Music.

In 2007 his organ piece "Quiet Rush" was picked as one of the premieres of the year by Classical Music Magazine. It was also played at the Annual Festival of New Organ Music in 2009. In recent years choral composition has become his main focus: In 2019 he won the 40th Ithaca College Choral Composition Competition and the Freudig Singers Choral Composition. His piece 'Dreaming Figurines' was voted 3rd from 344 in the Progressive Classical Music Award 2019.

Jolliffe graduated from Hertford College, Oxford in 1994. He also studied at the Royal College of Music under Academy Award-winner Dario Marianelli. He has also studied at Dartington International Summer School and completed residencies at Banff Center for the Arts, Canada and the Wurlitzer Foundation, New Mexico.

Jolliffe writes music for television, sometimes with the composer Julian Hamlin. They have written music for hundreds of documentaries that have been broadcast worldwide. Jolliffe and Hamlin have composed music for the popular BBC TV series Who Do You Think You Are?, 'Sort your life out' and the ITV series Long Lost Family and Channel Four's Unreported World (series 24- present) as well as 'Grand Designs: The Street'. Many productions have been nominated for BAFTAs. In 2016 his score to Elizabeth at 90 - a Family Tribute was nominated for an RTS Award for best score. Other Royal films include A Jubilee Tribute to the Queen, Prince Charles at 60 and Prince Charles at 70. In 2021 'Quentin Blake: My life in Drawing' scored by Jolliffe was broadcast on Christmas Day. His music for the programme for Fantastic Mr Dahl was featured as an added extra on the DVD of Tim Burton's ''Charlie and the Chocolate Factory' '.

References

External links
 
 
http://info.bbcmusicmagazine.com/
http://www.hamlinandjolliffe.com

Living people
British composers
Year of birth missing (living people)
Alumni of Hertford College, Oxford
British television composers